The Sham Mirrors is the third studio album by Norwegian avant-garde metal band Arcturus. It was released on April 9, 2002.

The Sham Mirrors is a departure from the band's previous albums, featuring a much more modern, space-influenced sound, as opposed to the layered, classical melodies of 1997's La Masquerade Infernale. The album contains elements of trip hop, ambient music and electronica in addition to the band's usual progressive black metal sound. Lyrically, the album deals with abstract science fiction-themed subjects, a stark contrast to the theatrical and Satanic lyrics of the band's earlier work. The album cover depicts a model drawing of the upper part of the Apollo spaceship.

This is the last album to feature Kristoffer Rygg on vocals.

Track listing

Personnel 

Arcturus
 Kristoffer Rygg (credited as "Trickster G. Rex") - vocals, producer, engineer
 Knut M. Valle - electric guitar, engineer
 Dag F. Gravem - bass guitar
 Steinar Sverd Johnsen - keyboards, engineer
 Jan Axel Blomberg (credited as "Hellhammer") - drums, percussion

Additional Musicians

 Ihsahn - vocals (on "Radical Cut")
 Mathias Eick - trumpet (on "Ad Absurdum", "Collapse Generation" and "Radical Cut")
 Hugh Steven James Mingay - low frequentation (on "Radical Cut")

Production Staff
 Phantom FX - co-producer
 Tore Ylwizaker - mixing
 Tom La Bomba - mastering

Charts

References 

Arcturus (band) albums
2002 albums
The End Records albums